The piculets are a distinctive subfamily, Picumninae, of small woodpeckers which occur mainly in tropical South America, with just three Asian and one African  species.

Like the true woodpeckers, piculets have large heads, long tongues which they use to extract their insect prey and zygodactyl feet, with two toes pointing forward, and two backwards. However, they lack the stiff tail feathers that the true woodpeckers use when climbing trees, so they are more likely than their relatives to perch on a branch rather than an upright trunk.

Their bills are shorter and less dagger-like than the true woodpeckers, so they look for insects and grubs mainly in decaying wood. Similarly, they re-use woodpecker holes for nesting, rather than making their own holes. The eggs are white, as with many hole nesters.

Typically these birds have grey or dull green upperparts and dark-streaked white underparts.

Systematics and evolution
Although not well known from fossils, the evolution of piculets is now considered rather straightforward. The disjunct occurrence of the genera, with one African species of the Southeast Asian Sasia and one Southeast Asian species of the American Picumnus is of comparatively recent origin. Molecular dating, calibrated with geographic events in the absence of a good fossil record, points at the Late Miocene, c. 8 MYA, as the point where the two genera divided into their two respective lineages. At that time, there was a notable global cooling period. The molecular distances between piculets and woodpeckers are comparatively small for subfamilies, agreeing with the hypothesis that the split between the three groups of woodpecker-like picids subfamilies occurred only during the Miocene climatic optimum, around 15 MYA. The later radiation of South American piculets is probably due to changes in topology and climate fluctuations during the Pliocene and Pleistocene. The genus Verreauxia may be accepted because of pronounced morphological similarities, but the two Picumnus lineages, despite having diverged long ago, are virtually alike except for head coloration.

The Antillean piculet (Nesoctites micromegas) has proven to be a very distinct species evolutionarily between piculets and woodpeckers and thus is nowadays placed in a subfamily of its own.

The arrangement of species in the genera is as follows

Genus Picumnus
 Speckled piculet,  Picumnus innominatus
 Bar-breasted piculet,  Picumnus aurifrons
 Orinoco piculet,  Picumnus pumilus
 Lafresnaye's piculet,  Picumnus lafresnayi
 Golden-spangled piculet,  Picumnus exilis
 Black-dotted piculet,  Picumnus nigropunctatus
 Ecuadorian piculet,  Picumnus sclateri
 Scaled piculet,  Picumnus squamulatus
 White-bellied piculet,  Picumnus spilogaster
 Arrowhead piculet,  Picumnus minutissimus
 Spotted piculet,  Picumnus pygmaeus
 Speckle-chested piculet,  Picumnus steindachneri
 Varzea piculet,  Picumnus varzeae
 White-barred piculet,  Picumnus cirratus
 Ocellated piculet,  Picumnus dorbygnianus
 Ochre-collared piculet,  Picumnus temminckii
 White-wedged piculet,  Picumnus albosquamatus
 Rusty-necked piculet,  Picumnus fuscus
 Rufous-breasted piculet,  Picumnus rufiventris Ochraceous piculet,  Picumnus limae
 Mottled piculet,  Picumnus nebulosus
 Plain-breasted piculet,  Picumnus castelnau
 Fine-barred piculet,  Picumnus subtilis
 Olivaceous piculet,  Picumnus olivaceus
 Greyish piculet,  Picumnus granadensis
 Chestnut piculet,  Picumnus cinnamomeus

Genus Sasia
 African piculet, Sasia africana
 Rufous piculet,  Sasia abnormis
 White-browed piculet,  Sasia ochracea

References

 Benz, Brett W.; Robbins, Mark B. & Peterson, A. Townsend (2006)  Evolutionary history of woodpeckers and allies (Aves: Picidae): Placing key taxa on the phylogenetic tree. Molecular Phylogenetics and Evolution 40: 389–399.   (HTML abstract)
 del Hoyo, J.; Elliott, A. & Sargatal, J. (editors) (2002): Handbook of Birds of the World, Volume 7: Jacamars to Woodpeckers. Lynx Edicions, Barcelona. 
 Fuchs, J.; Ohlson, J. I.; Ericson, Per G. P. & Pasquet, E. (2006): Molecular phylogeny and biogeographic history of the piculets (Piciformes: Picumninae). Journal of Avian Biology 37'(5): 487–496.  (HTML abstract)

External links
Piculet videos, photos & sounds on the Internet Bird Collection